John William Sunderland (16 February 1896 – 24 November 1945) was an English Labour Party politician.

After serving in the First World War, Sunderland became secretary of the Todmorden Weavers Association, and a member of Lancashire County Council, serving as group leader.

He was elected as Member of Parliament for Preston at the July 1945 general election, defeating Randolph Churchill and Edward Cobb, but four months later he died suddenly at Barrow, near Whalley, Lancashire, while visiting a children's school, aged 49.

See also
List of United Kingdom MPs with the shortest service

References

Sources

External links 
 

1896 births
1945 deaths
Members of Lancashire County Council
Labour Party (UK) MPs for English constituencies
UK MPs 1945–1950
United Textile Factory Workers' Association-sponsored MPs